'Sayyadwada' (Cheduvada) is a small Shia Muslims village in East Godavari district in the state of Andhra Pradesh, India. It is near the district headquarters Kakinada, about 25 km away. A Survey by Madras office in 1927 by Sri D.Venkatachalaayya Garu and LGB Firth included 'Cheduvada' in Cocanada Taluk. Cheduvada encompassed 330.00 acres and consisted of four ponds namely Mattakarra Cheruvu, Angulu Cheruvu, Ura Cheruvu and Pedda Cheruvu

See also
 East Godavari district

References

External links

Villages in East Godavari district